The 1987 FIRS Intercontinental Cup was the third edition of the roller hockey tournament known as the Intercontinental Cup, played in December 1987. HC Liceo La Coruña won the cup, defeating Concepción PC.

Matches

See also
FIRS Intercontinental Cup

References 

FIRS Intercontinental Cup
1987 in roller hockey
1987 in Spanish sport
International roller hockey competitions hosted by Spain